The Greater Will is a 1915 American silent drama film directed by Harley Knoles and starring Cyril Maude, Lois Meredith and Montagu Love.

Cast
 Cyril Maude as Professor Cornelius Sloane
 Lois Meredith as Peggy Sloane
 Montagu Love as Stuart Watson
 Henry Carvill as Father Malone
 William T. Carleton as Edward Carson
 Charles H. France
 Margot Williams
 Lionel Belmore
 Walter Craven

References

Bibliography
 Soister, John T., Nicolella, Henry & Joyce, Steve. American Silent Horror, Science Fiction and Fantasy Feature Films, 1913-1929. McFarland, 2014.

External links
 

1915 films
1915 drama films
1910s English-language films
American silent feature films
Silent American drama films
American black-and-white films
Films directed by Harley Knoles
Pathé Exchange films
1910s American films